The Ryan Baronetcy, of Hintlesham in the County of Suffolk, is a title in the Baronetage of the United Kingdom. It was created on 8 September 1919 for Gerald Ryan, later General Manager and Chairman of Phoenix Insurance Co.

Ryan baronets, of Hintelsham  (1919)
Sir Gerald Hemmington Ryan, 1st Baronet (1861 –1937)
Sir Gerald Ellis Ryan, 2nd Baronet (1888–1947)
Sir Derek Gerald Ryan, 3rd Baronet (1922–1990)
Sir Derek Gerald Ryan, 4th Baronet (born 1954)

Notes

References
Kidd, Charles, Williamson, David (editors). Debrett's Peerage and Baronetage (1990 edition). New York: St Martin's Press, 1990, 

Ryan